Minka Govekar (28 October 1874 – 10 April 1950) was a Slovene teacher, translator, and campaigner for women's rights.

Life
Minka Govekar was born in Trebnje in 1874. Completing her education at Ljubljana from 1889 to 1893, she qualified as a teacher in 1895 and married in 1897.

In 1926 Govekar edited Slovenska žena (Slovenian Woman), a collection of articles on women in different periods of Slovenian history and different creative professions:

In her own contribution to the collection, an essay on women authors, Govekar provided information on Fanny Hausmann, Jospina Turnograjska, Lujica Pesjak, Pavlina Pajkova, Marica Nadlišek Bartol, Marica II Strnad Cizarljeva and Zofka Kveder-Demetrovic.

Works
 Dobra kuharica (The Good Cook), 1903
 Dobra gospodinja (The Good Housewife), 1908
 Slovenska žena (Slovenian Woman), Ljubljana, 1926

References

1874 births
1950 deaths
Slovenian translators
Slovenian women activists
Slovenian feminists